Vogelzang is a surname. Notable people with the surname include: 

 Chris Vogelzang (born 1962), Dutch business executive, CEO of Danske Bank
 Nicholas J. Vogelzang, medical oncologist
 Peter Vogelzang (born 1945), Dutch businessman

Dutch-language surnames